The HG postcode area, also known as the Harrogate postcode area, is a group of five postcode districts in England, which are subdivisions of three post towns. These postcode districts cover Harrogate, Ripon and Knaresborough in North Yorkshire.

HG1 and HG2 cover most of the urban area of Harrogate. HG1 covers areas north of The Stray including the town centre, while HG2 covers areas to the south and west of The Stray. East of The Stray, HG1 generally covers areas to the north of the A59 Knaresborough Road, while HG2 covers areas to the south. HG3 spans across some of the town's westernmost suburbs, some settlements immediately to the south, as well as a large rural area to the north and west. HG4 covers Ripon and some surrounding settlements and rural areas. HG5 covers Knaresborough and some rural areas to the north and east. 

It is the only postcode area located entirely within North Yorkshire, and when ranked by number of postcode districts it is the second smallest postcode area in the United Kingdom, behind only the ZE postcode area which has three districts. However, many postcode areas with a greater number of districts cover fewer square miles in total.



Coverage
The approximate coverage of the postcode districts:

|-
! HG1
| HARROGATE
| Central, Bilton, High Harrogate, Jennyfields, Duchy, New Park
| Harrogate
|-
! HG2
| HARROGATE
| Oatlands, Woodlands, Hookstone, Rossett, Pannal Ash, Harlow Hill, Low Harrogate, Hornbeam Park
| Harrogate
|-
! HG3
| HARROGATE
| Jennyfields, Pannal, Burn Bridge, Kirkby Overblow, Killinghall, Greenhow, Fewston, Beckwithshaw, Spofforth, Bishop Monkton, Bishop Thornton, Glasshouses, Follifoot, Pateley Bridge, Summerbridge, Ripley, Brearton, Burton Leonard, Netherby, Hampsthwaite, Nidd, South Stainley, Wormald Green, Markington, Burnt Yates, Bedlam, Shaw Mills, Birstwith, Warsill, Darley, Dacre, Wath-in-Nidderdale, Middlesmoor, Lofthouse, Ramsgill, Stean, Bewerley, Thornthwaite, Thruscross, West End
| Harrogate, Craven
|-
! HG4
| RIPON
| Ripon, North Stainley, High Grantley, Masham, West Tanfield, Thornton Watlass, Thornton Steward, Sawley, Eavestone, Littlethorpe, Skelton-on-Ure, Marton-le-Moor, North Stainley, Wath, Nunwick, Melmerby, Middleton Quernhow, Bridge Hewick, Sharow, Copt Hewick, Hutton Conyers, Aldfield, Kirkby Malzeard, Leighton, Colsterdale, Gollinglith Foot, Azerley, Galphay, Winksley, Sutton Grange, Grewelthorpe, Rookwith, Low Ellington, Thirn
| Harrogate, Hambleton, Richmondshire
|-
! HG5
| KNARESBOROUGH
| Knaresborough, Scotton, Goldsborough, Arkendale, Allerton Mauleverer, Hopperton, Flaxby, Coneythorpe, Staveley, Ferrensby, Farnham, Calcutt, Plompton
| Harrogate
|}

Map

See also
Postcode Address File
List of postcode areas in the United Kingdom

References

External links
Royal Mail's Postcode Address File
A quick introduction to Royal Mail's Postcode Address File (PAF)

Borough of Harrogate
Postcode areas covering Yorkshire and the Humber